Roberto H. Todd Wells (October 13, 1862 – September 17, 1955) was a co-founder of the Puerto Rico Republican Party. A native of Saint Thomas, U.S. Virgin Islands, he was born on October 13, 1862, and died in San Juan, Puerto Rico, on September 16, 1955.  He served as a delegate to the House in 1900 and mayor of San Juan from 1903 to 1923.

Family
Todd Wells married Celestina Borrás and had a son named Roberto H. Todd Borrás. Todd Wells's son, born on March 6, 1891, in New York City, served as an Associate Justice of the Supreme Court of Puerto Rico and Chief Justice of the Supreme Court of Puerto Rico from 1951 to 1952.

See also

 List of mayors of San Juan, Puerto Rico
List of Puerto Ricans

References

Sources
webpage about distinguished Puerto Ricans

1862 births
1955 deaths
Republican Party (Puerto Rico) politicians
Mayors of San Juan, Puerto Rico